The Emir of the State of Kuwait is the monarch and head of state of Kuwait, the country's most powerful office. The emirs of Kuwait are members of the Al Sabah dynasty.

Sheikh Nawaf Al-Ahmad Al-Jaber Al-Sabah became the emir of Kuwait on 30 September 2020, following the death of Sabah Al-Ahmad Al-Jaber Al-Sabah. He ascended the throne on 30 September 2020.

Rules and traditions of succession
Succession to the throne of Kuwait is limited to the descendants of Mubarak Al-Sabah. The position of emir is also traditionally alternated between the two main branches of the Al Sabah family, the Al-Ahmed and Al-Salem branches. The reigning emir must appoint an heir apparent within one year of his accession to the throne; the nominee for consideration as crown prince has to be a senior member of the Al Sabah family. 

The prime minister is appointed by the Emir.

Compensation
Annual compensation for the Emir is defined. The annual compensation is currently set to 50 million KWD.

Emirs of Kuwait (1752–present)

See also

Politics of Kuwait

Notes

References

External links
Amiri Diwan of Kuwait website

Kuwait
Kuwait, Emirs

Emirs
History of Kuwait